Minbya (Mongbra) is a town in Rakhine State, in the westernmost part of Myanmar (Burma). It is located along the Lay Myo River and foothill of Kyein Range. Kyein Taung Pagoda is one of the prominent Pagoda in Rakhine State. Ramaung Bridge is also well-known. Minbya is convenient in transportation as Sittwe-Yangon high-way road lies near Minbya. Ga Rim Gian is a nice place to visit with the pleasant sights.

Education
The education of Minbya (Mongbra) is fairly good. There are three high schools: BEHS 1,2,3 which are the main academic bodies of town. Many primary and middle schools persist. On the other hand, there were no place for English Language study and computer training before 2014. In 2014, Buddhist monks who are also scholars at various universities of India opened a center for young students called The Light Of Mizzima. The center offers computer and English courses for one year and provide scholarship for outstanding students. Having say that, there are still many things to be developed.

Natural disasters
On 15 June 2010, strong rains destroyed more than 25 buildings, including houses, school buildings, and a mosque. Close to 200 people were housed in mosques of several nearby villages.

On 12 November 2011, all 567 permanent shops of the Minbya central market were destroyed in a fire accident.

During the last weekend of July 2015, there was a heavy rain and cause the flooding and then this situation was worse as the Cyclone Komen hit the Arakan Coastal on 30 July. It caused great damages in urban and rural area. Many farms were destroyed. After flooding, many civil charity group were came to aid the rural residents. This flooding was also taking place in Mrauk-Oo, Kyauk Taw townships.

References

External links
 Satellite map at Maplandia.com

Township capitals of Myanmar
Populated places in Rakhine State